Forces of Victory is the debut solo album by the dub poet Linton Kwesi Johnson. It was released in 1979 on Island Records.

The album peaked at No. 66 on the UK Albums Chart.

Production
The album was produced by Linton Kwesi Johnson and Dennis "Blackbeard" Bovell. Bovell, Lloyd "Jah Bunny" Donaldson and Webster Johnson were members of Matumbi.

Critical reception
AllMusic wrote: "Dramatic and intense to the point of claustrophobia, Forces of Victory is not simply one of the most important reggae records of its time, it's one of the most important reggae records ever recorded." Trouser Press wrote that "Johnson’s voice gains greater range and expressiveness while his poetry speaks of dire truths, and sounds increasingly complex, compact and expert."

Track listing
All tracks by Linton Kwesi Johnson

"Want Fi Goh Rave" – 4:20
"It Noh Funny" – 3:42
"Sonny's Lettah (Anti-Sus Poem)" – 3:50
"Independent Intavenshan" – 4:20
"Fite Dem Back" – 4:27
"Reality Poem" – 4:44
"Forces of Viktry" – 4:56
"Time Come" – 3:28

Personnel
Linton Kwesi Johnson - vocals
Floyd Lawson (tracks: 1, 5), Vivian Weathers (tracks: 2-4, 6-7) - bass
Lloyd "Jah Bunny" Donaldson (tracks: 1-4, 7), Winston "Crab" Curniffe (tracks: 5-6, 8) - drums, percussion
John Kpiaye - lead and rhythm guitar
Julio Finn - harmonica
Rico - trombone
Dick Cuthell - flugelhorn
Dennis Bovell (as "The Invisible One"), Webster Johnson - keyboards, piano
Everald "Fari" Forrest - percussion
Dennis Bovell, Vivian Weathers, Winston Bennett - additional voices
Technical
Dennis "Blackbeard" Bovell, John Caffrey - engineer
Dennis Morris - photography
Zebulon Design - design

References 

1979 debut albums
Linton Kwesi Johnson albums
Island Records albums